Four submarines of the French Navy have borne the name Morse ("Walrus"):

 ,  a pioneering French Navy submarine of 1899
 ,  ex-Royal Navy submarine , transferred in 1944
 , a Narval-class submarine of 1960

French Navy ship names